Anchorage Wolverines are a Tier 2 Ice Hockey team that became a member of the North American Hockey League in 2021.

History 
The Anchorage Wolverines junior hockey team announced Evan Trupp as the second head coach.

The Anchorage Wolverines, who also boast the Volunteer of the Year, were named Organization of the Year in their first campaign. Three Wolverines players were further selected for the All-Midwest Division Team.

Playoffs 
2022
 Nelson Center- Anchorage Wolverines 2 at Springfield Jr. Blues 1 - Status: Final
 Nelson Center- Anchorage Wolverines 2 at Springfield Jr. Blues 1 - Status: Final
 Nelson Center- Anchorage Wolverines 4 (OT) at Springfield Jr. Blues 3 - Status: Final OT
 Ben Boeke Ice Arena- MN Wilderness 1 at Anchorage Wolverines 4 - Status: Final
 Ben Boeke Ice Arena- MN Wilderness 7 at Anchorage Wolverines 2 - Status: Final
 Ben Boeke Ice Arena- MN Wilderness 3 at Anchorage Wolverines 4 (OT) - Status: Final OT2
 Northwoods Credit Union Arena- Anchorage Wolverines 5 at MN Wilderness 1 - Status: Final
 Fogerty Ice Arena-South- Anchorage Wolverines 2 (OT) at St. Cloud Norsemen 1 - Status: Final OT
 Fogerty Ice Arena-South- St. Cloud Norsemen 2 at Anchorage Wolverines 6 - Status: Final
 Fogerty Ice Arena-South- Anchorage Wolverines 0 at New Jersey Titans 3 - Status: Final

References

External links 
 Official Website
 Facebook
 Twitter
 Instagram
 Anchorage on YouTube
 Anchorage Wolverines Roster

Sports in Anchorage, Alaska
Ice hockey teams in Alaska
North American Hockey League teams
Ice hockey clubs established in 2021